The , was the 56th edition of annual NHK's Kōhaku Uta Gassen, held on December 31, 2005, live from NHK Hall (Tokyo, Japan). It was broadcast in Japan through NHK General Television (TV), NHK Radio 1 (Radio), and worldwide through NHK World Premium . This event was filmed and aired from NHK Hall in Japan. Airtime was from 19:20 to 23:45 (with an interruption from 21:25 to 21:30 for news). All times are JST. Viewership ratings in Kantō Region: 42.9%

Broadcasting
In Japan channels such as NHK General TV, NHKBS2, NHKBShi, and NHK Radio.
For overseas, NHK World Premium ( not broadcast on NHK World TV ) and NHK World · Radio Japan ( Asia Continent · Southeast Asia region only, time zone broadcasting in other areas ).
NHK World Premium rebroadcast was held at 7:20 - 11:50 on January 5, 2006 (Heisei era 2006) ( Suspended news of 5 minutes is included).

Events leading up to broadcast date 
On November 21, the songs of "Top 100" was announced.
On December 1, both red and white contestants were announced.
There are 16 pairs of the first participation out of a total of 60 pairs of red and white each 30 pairs.
Matsutoya received a consultation of the appearance, it said that it made the commitment of appearance as the same unit in that condition.

On December 21, the participating singers were announced, the songs are coherently announced nine days after the singers release on December 30.
On December 30, all participating performer and songs are announced.

Personnel

Presenters
Red team host: Yukie Nakama
White team host: Koji Yamamoto
Mediators: Monta Mino and Motoyo Yamane

Judges 
 Kotoōshū Katsunori (sumo wrestler)
 Hiroko Yakushimaru (actress), plays in film Always Sanchōme no Yūhi
 Masami Nagasawa (actress), plays in Taiga drama Akira Tsuji
 Yoji Yamada (director), directed Love and Honor
 Mitsuko Mori (actress), plays in Time Slip 60 Years Showa Heisei Always" Corner 
 Takaya Kamikawa (actor), plays in film The Good Name is Tsuji
 Kaori Manabe (television host), host of NHK Education: Science Zero 
 Hayashiya Shōzō IX (rakugoka, 9th generation
 Harumi Kurihara (celebrity chef)

Performance order
Editions appeared in are in parenthesis.

Medley songs

Viewer Rating
On the night of New Year's Eve, TBS and Fuji TV in high audience ratings prepared a special program of martial arts that can be expected ( " K-1 PREMIUM 2005 Dynamite !! ", " PRIDE Man Festival 2005 "), Nippon Television Ya TV Asahi also organized their own special programs to compete against red and white. In addition, TV TOKYO, which is broadcasting the yearly forgetful song, broadcast the medley of Matsudaira Ken 's " Matsuken Samba I to III" at around 19:20, which is the start time of red and white (which was defeated for Kohaku).

In a further intensification of the audience competition was expected, the moderator Minomon other is "viewing rate of 65%, 50% at least," but was showing a willingness, the result is one part of 35.4% (previous year 30.8%), 2 (The data is based on Kanto area, comprehensive TV only, BS2 · BS Hi-Vision not included, according to Video Research Inc, etc.) It was 42.9% (39.3% in the previous year), 42.9% (previous year 39.3% ). In the final red and white score result announcement, the highest audience rating of the moment was recorded 50.1%. Only in the situation of updating the minimum in a historical record of the past year, however, it was far less than the targeted 65%, and Mino announced the comment "I am mourning my inaction."

Also, the audience rating was 17.0% (20: 00-23: FUJI TV " PRIDE MAN FESTIVAL 2005 "), TBS " K-1 PREMIUM 2005 Dynamite !! " (21: 00 To 23:40) was 14.8% (20.1% in the previous year) etc.

The rebroadcast that had been done on comprehensive television in February of the following year in the past two years was not done because the organization was organized at the center of the Turin Olympic Games.

Final Results & Ratings

References

NHK Kōhaku Uta Gassen events
NHK Kōhaku Uta Gassen
NHK Kōhaku Uta Gassen
NHK Kōhaku Uta Gassen